Hallenstadion is an arena in Chur, Switzerland.  It is primarily used for ice hockey and is the home arena of EHC Chur. Hallenstadion holds 6,545 people.

External links 

Indoor arenas in Switzerland
Indoor ice hockey venues in Switzerland